The 1916 United States presidential election in New Hampshire took place on November 7, 1916, as part of the 1916 United States presidential election which was held throughout all contemporary 48 states. Voters chose four representatives, or electors to the Electoral College, who voted for president and vice president. 

New Hampshire was won by the Democratic nominees, incumbent Democratic President Woodrow Wilson and Vice President Thomas R. Marshall. They defeated Republican nominee, U.S. Supreme Court Justice Charles Evans Hughes of New York, and his running mate Senator Charles W. Fairbanks of Indiana. 

Wilson won New Hampshire by a very narrow margin of just 0.06283% (one vote in 1,592) and 56 popular votes. In terms of popular vote margin, this is the third-closest state presidential election race on record, behind two in Maryland from 1832 and 1904. In terms of percentage, it stands as the ninth-closest behind the two Maryland elections above, two from California in 1892 and 1912, Kentucky in 1896, Hawaii’s inaugural 1960 election, and the 2000 Florida and New Mexico elections. This is the only presidential election in which New Hampshire voted Democratic, while neighboring Massachusetts voted Republican.

The giant Rexall drugstore chain made an early opinion poll that predicted Wilson’s narrow victory in the Granite State and in California almost perfectly, leading to a reputation for accuracy that was to be lost twenty years subsequently.

This was the first time since 1852 that Sullivan County voted for a Democratic presidential candidate.

Results

Results by county

See also
 United States presidential elections in New Hampshire

References

New Hampshire
1916
1916 New Hampshire elections